Annette Kolb (pseudonym of Anna Mathilde Kolb; born February 3, 1870, in Munich; died December 3, 1967, in Munich) was a German author and pacifist.

She became active in pacifist causes during World War I and this caused her political difficulties from then on. She left Germany in the 1920s and her works were banned during the Third Reich. She wrote novels on high society and in later life wrote nonfiction about musicians. In 1955 she won the Goethe Prize.

See also 
 Exilliteratur
 List of peace activists

References

External links
 
 
 

1870 births
1967 deaths
20th-century essayists
20th-century German women writers
Chevaliers of the Légion d'honneur
German biographers
German memoirists
German pacifists
German women essayists
German women in World War I
German women novelists
Exilliteratur writers
Knights Commander of the Order of Merit of the Federal Republic of Germany
Writers from Munich
Pseudonymous women writers
Recipients of the Pour le Mérite (civil class)
German women biographers
Women memoirists
20th-century pseudonymous writers